Luka Krajnc (born 19 September 1994) is a Slovenian professional footballer who plays as a defender for Hannover 96.

Club career
Krajnc began his football career at the age of eight when his father took him on a trial with the Slovenian football club Maribor. He signed his first professional contract with Maribor at the age of 16 and played for the main squad in a couple of friendly matches. On 29 May 2011, he played his first and only 1. SNL match for Maribor in the last round of the 2010–11 season, with Maribor already crowned champions. At the time of his debut he was the youngest player ever with an appearance for Maribor in a 1. SNL match, a record which lasted until 25 March 2012.

On 3 April 2011, Krajnc signed a pre-contract with Italian Serie A club Genoa. The transfer fee paid by Genoa was undisclosed, but was reported to be close to €1 million. He joined his new club on 1 July 2011. He began his career at Genoa with their Primavera side which he also captained, before making a debut for the main squad on 27 October 2012 at San Siro in a league match against AC Milan. With 18 years, one month and 14 days he became the youngest Slovenian player ever with an appearances in the Italian top division, Serie A.

On 3 July 2013 he moved to Cesena in temporary co-ownership deal. In June 2015 Genoa acquired Cesena's share and became the sole owner of the player's rights.

On 31 August 2016, Krajnc joined Sampdoria on a season-long loan. In the second part of the 2016–17 season, he was loaned to Frosinone.

On 20 June 2018, Frosinone turned Krajnc's loan into a permanent deal for undisclosed fee.

In September 2020, he joined Fortuna Düsseldorf on a season-long loan.

On 24 August 2021, Krajnc joined Hannover 96 on a three-year contract.

International career
Krajnc has represented Slovenia at all youth levels from under-16 to under-21. On 30 March 2015 he made his senior international debut, replacing Dominic Maroh after 65 minutes of an eventual 1–0 friendly defeat to Qatar at the Jassim bin Hamad Stadium in Doha.

Style of play
Krajnc, who is left footed, primarily plays in central defence and is praised for his pace, strength, passing and ability on the ball.

Personal life
Krajnc is from Kapla na Kozjaku in the hilly region of northeastern Slovenia near the Austrian border, roughly 37 km from the city of Maribor. Before moving to Maribor he usually had to study and do his homework on the back seat of his father's car, traveling to and from training.

References

External links
 
 

1994 births
Living people
People from Ptuj
Slovenian footballers
Association football defenders
Slovenian PrvaLiga players
Serie A players
Serie B players
2. Bundesliga players
NK Maribor players
Genoa C.F.C. players
A.C. Cesena players
Cagliari Calcio players
U.C. Sampdoria players
Frosinone Calcio players
Fortuna Düsseldorf players
Hannover 96 players
Slovenian expatriate footballers
Expatriate footballers in Italy
Slovenian expatriate sportspeople in Italy
Expatriate footballers in Germany
Slovenian expatriate sportspeople in Germany
Slovenia youth international footballers
Slovenia under-21 international footballers
Slovenia international footballers